is a Japanese track and field sprinter who specialises in the 400 metres. His personal best in the event is 45.53 seconds set in Osaka in 2017. He competed in the 4 × 400 metres relay at the 2017 World Championships.

Personal bests

International competition

National titles

References

External links

1993 births
Living people
Japanese male sprinters
Sportspeople from Kagawa Prefecture
World Athletics Championships athletes for Japan
International Pacific University alumni
21st-century Japanese people